Bibiocephala is a genus of net-winged midges in the family Blephariceridae. There are about five described species in Bibiocephala.

Species
These five species belong to the genus Bibiocephala:
 Bibiocephala grandis Osten Sacken, 1874
 Bibiocephala infuscata (Matsumura, 1916)
 Bibiocephala komaensis (Kitakami, 1950)
 Bibiocephala maxima Brodskij, 1954
 Bibiocephala minor Kitakami, 1931

References

Further reading

 

Blephariceridae
Articles created by Qbugbot
nematocera genera